Süreyya Ağaoğlu (1903, Shusha, Azerbaijan – 29 December 1989, Istanbul) was a Turkish-Azerbaijani writer, jurist, and the first female lawyer in Turkish history.

Early life and education
Ağaoğlu was the daughter of Ahmet Ağaoğlu, a prominent Azerbaijani and later Turkish politician of the early 20th century. After the fall of the Azerbaijan Democratic Republic in 1920, the Ağaoğlus moved to Turkey where Süreyya enrolled in the Faculty of Law at Istanbul University.

Career
After graduation Ağaoğlu worked as a lawyer from 1927 to her death in 1989. In 1928, taking the free lawyer license and became Turkey's first female lawyer. For her initiative, Istanbul Bar Association was elected a member of the International Bar Association. From 1946 to 1960, she was the only female board member of this union. After 1960 Turkish coup d'état she became his brother's lawyer. At that time, he entered politics as a member of the newly formed New Turkey Party and became the party's leader in

At one point she worked as an assistant to Professor Schwartz and Türkan Rado. She is the author of books What I Saw in London (Londra'da Gördüklerim) and One Life Has Passed Just Like This (Bir Hayat Böyle Geçti), where she discussed many legal issues and wrote biographical information about her father. She was one of the contributors to the women's magazine Kadın Gazetesi.

Personal life 
She married German lawyer Werner Taschenbreker in 1950 and divorced in the 1960s. They had no children.

Family 
Her father Ahmet Ağaoğlu was a prominent Azerbaijani and naturalized Turkish politician, publicist and journalist. He was one of the founders of Pan-Turkism. Her sister Tezer Taşkıran was a writer, politician and teacher. Her brother Samet Ağaoğlu was a poet and politician.

Death
Süreyya Ağaoğlu died of a cerebral haemorrhage in 1989.

References

 Who is who database - Biography of Süreyya Ağaoğlu 

1903 births
1989 deaths
Writers from Shusha
People from Elizavetpol Governorate
Turkish people of Azerbaijani descent
Soviet emigrants to Turkey
Istanbul University Faculty of Law alumni
20th-century Turkish lawyers
Turkish women lawyers
20th-century Turkish women writers
20th-century Turkish writers
Burials at Feriköy Cemetery
Ağaoğlu family